In database computing, Oracle Real Application Testing (RAT) provides a separately-licensed environment for controlled and reproducible testing of Oracle database use and changes.

References 

Oracle software
Software testing tools